Horst Schneider (born 13 February 1939) is an Austrian biathlete. He competed in the 20 km individual event at the 1968 Winter Olympics.

References

External links
 

1939 births
Living people
Austrian male biathletes
Olympic biathletes of Austria
Biathletes at the 1968 Winter Olympics
People from Lienz
Sportspeople from Tyrol (state)